Nuri Fatih Aydın (born 1 January 1995) is a Turkish footballer who plays as a midfielder for Yeni Malatyaspor. He made his Süper Lig debut on 6 May 2011.

References

External links

 
 
 
 

1995 births
Sportspeople from Konya
Living people
Turkish footballers
Turkey youth international footballers
Association football midfielders
Eskişehirspor footballers
Bozüyükspor footballers
Dardanelspor footballers
Yeni Malatyaspor footballers
Kastamonuspor footballers
Sarıyer S.K. footballers
Sakaryaspor footballers
Süper Lig players
TFF First League players
TFF Second League players
TFF Third League players